London Midland and Scottish Railway (LMS) Stanier Black Five, LMS number 4767, BR number 44767 is a preserved steam locomotive.  In preservation it has carried the name George Stephenson though it never bore this in service with British Railways.

Service 

4767 was completed on the last day of the LMS, 31 December 1947 at Crewe Works. It was unique amongst the 842-strong class in that it featured outside Stephenson link motion in addition to other experimental features; a double chimney, Timken roller bearings throughout and electric lighting.

These modifications were part of a series of experiments by George Ivatt to improve the already excellent William Stanier-designed Black Five.

4767 was renumbered 44767 by British Railways after nationalisation in 1948. Its double chimney was removed in 1953. It was withdrawn in December 1967 after a working life of only 20 years.

Allocations 
44767 was only transferred between sheds five times during its career with British Railways with it is first allocation being to Crewe North and it is final allocation being at Carlisle Kingmoor. The list below shows the shed locations of 44767 on particular dates.

Preservation 
44767 was purchased directly from British Railways for preservation by Ian Storey and was stored at Carnforth until 1974 when it was taken to Thornaby for restoration to running order by the North Eastern Locomotive Preservation Group. Restoration work was complete for the 150th anniversary of the Stockton and Darlington Railway in 1975. At Shildon, the former Secretary of State for Northern Ireland, William Whitelaw named 44767 after famous railway engineer George Stephenson. A plaque below its nameplates reads:

This locomotive was named by the Right Hon. William Whitelaw C.H. M.C. M.R. at Shildon on August 25th
1975 to commemorate the 150th anniversary of the Stockton and Darlington Railway.

In 1988, it was featured in 'The Thistle' music video by Jesse Rae. Filming locations on the West Highland Line with Glenfinnan Viaduct.
 
The locomotive saw regular use along the mainline, including services in Scotland. The locomotive was based on the North Yorkshire Moors Railway before being taken out of service at the end of 2002 for a full overhaul.

In December 2009, 44767 returned to steam at Morpeth in Northumberland, where it was overhauled, from where it was moved to the Great Central Railway for running in and painting.

Between May and September 2010, 44767 was in use at the North Norfolk Railway, before visiting the West Somerset Railway for their Autumn Gala. It then spent the winter of 2010 at the Churnet Valley Railway, before visiting the Keighley and Worth Valley Railway for their winter steam gala in February 2011. It then returned to the North Yorkshire Moors Railway for the 2011 season, before returning to the Churnet Valley Railway for the 2011 winter season, although its stay there was curtailed due to firebox troubles. Following a two-year repair effort, the engine re-entered service at the North Norfolk Railway in February 2014, where it ran for the rest of the year, before moving to Swanwick at the Midland Railway – Butterley to undergo work.
In September 2018, 44767 was sold to the West Coast Railway Company.

References

External links 

 Railuk database
 NYMR page
 Preserved British Steam Locomotives, 44767
 Talks for sale of 44767

44767
Preserved London, Midland and Scottish Railway steam locomotives
Individual locomotives of Great Britain
Railway locomotives introduced in 1947
Standard gauge steam locomotives of Great Britain